No More Pain (stylized as NO MORE PAIИ) is the fifth studio album by Japanese boy band KAT-TUN and was released in Japan on June 16, 2010 by J-One Records. The album was released in two editions: a limited edition version with a DVD and a regular edition which features the bonus track, "Hello".

Album information

Fifth album release from KAT-TUN including solo song by each member and more for 14 tunes total. Regular edition includes a bonus track "Hello". Limited edition includes a bonus DVD with the music video form the album and making-of. Features alternate jacket artwork. Adam Greenburg on Allmusic gave the album three out of five stars, stating that "The album doesn't deliver anything new to the world of Japanese boy bands, but it keeps Kat-Tun in form. They don't obviously improve on previous works or detract from their legacy, as it were. Perfectly middle of the road."

Chart performance
No More Pain debuted at No.1 on Oricon Weekly Album Chart as of June 28 with first week sales of 154,096 copies and making KAT-TUN the first male group in 9 years to have 5 consecutive No.1 original albums after Kinki Kids from 1996-2001.

By the end of the year, the album was reported by Oricon to sell 182,563 copies and was later certified Gold by RIAJ denoting over 100,000 shipments.

Track listing

Charts and certifications

Sales and certifications

References

2010 albums
KAT-TUN albums